Gōda, Gouda or Goda (written: 合田 or 郷田) is a Japanese surname. Notable people with the surname include:

, Japanese animator
, Japanese voice actor, narrator and sound director
, Japanese actor
, Japanese shogi player
, Japanese animator

Fictional characters:
, a character in the anime series Ghost in the Shell: Stand Alone Complex 2nd Gig

See also
, Japanese emperor
Goda-ikka, a Japanese yakuza group
Gouda (disambiguation)
Goda (disambiguation)

Japanese-language surnames